The 2009–10 Talk 'N Text Tropang Texters season was the 20th season of the franchise in the Philippine Basketball Association (PBA).

Key dates
August 2: The 2009 PBA Draft took place in Fort Bonifacio, Taguig.

Draft picks

Roster

Depth chart

Philippine Cup

Eliminations

Standings

Game log

Eliminations

|- bgcolor="#bbffbb" 
| 1
| October 16
| Rain or Shine
| 85–76
| Cardona (16)
| Carey (11)
| Alapag (9)
| Araneta Coliseum
| 1–0
|- bgcolor="#bbffbb" 
| 2
| October 21
| Smart Gilas*
| 103–73
| Cardona (16)
| Peek (10)
| Alapag (6)
| Cuneta Astrodome
| 
|- bgcolor="#bbffbb" 
| 3
| October 25
| Sta. Lucia
| 100–83
| Cardona (25)
| Belasco (9)
| Alapag (9)
| Araneta Coliseum
| 2–0
|- bgcolor="#edbebf" 
| 4
| October 28
| San Miguel
| 90–100
| Alapag (22)
| Cardona, 3 others (5)
| Alapag (5)
| Araneta Coliseum
| 2–1

|- bgcolor="#edbebf" 
| 5
| November 8
| Purefoods
| 102–108
| Carey (20)
| Y. de Ocampo, Peek (7)
| Cardona, Alapag (5)
| Araneta Coliseum
| 2–2
|- bgcolor="#bbffbb"
| 6
| November 11
| Coca Cola
| 103–94
| Cardona (35)
| Belasco (10)
| Cardona (4)
| Araneta Coliseum
| 3–2
|- bgcolor="#bbffbb" 
| 7
| November 13
| Barako Bull
| 93–90
| Alapag (25)
| Peek (15)
| Alapag, Cardona (5)
| Ynares Center
| 4–2
|- bgcolor="#edbebf" 
| 8
| November 20
| Alaska
| 106–110
| R. de Ocampo (16)
| Carey (10)
| R. de Ocampo, Castro (5)
| Araneta Coliseum
| 4–3
|- bgcolor="#bbffbb" 
| 9
| November 25
| Barangay Ginebra
| 87–72
| Dillinger (18)
| Dillinger (18)
| Alapag (9)
| Araneta Coliseum
| 5–3
|- bgcolor="#bbffbb" 
| 10
| November 27
| Burger King
| 118–105
| Cardona (40)
| Cardona (11)
| Cardona, 2 others (4)
| Ynares Center
| 6–3

|- bgcolor="#edbebf" 
| 11
| December 2
| Rain or Shine
| 93–95
| Peek, Carey (14)
| R. de Ocampo (11)
| Alapag (5)
| Araneta Coliseum
| 6–4
|- bgcolor="#bbffbb" 
| 12
| December 5
| Coca Cola
| 107–104
| Cardona (21)
| Carey (14)
| Cardona (8)
| General Santos
| 7–4
|- bgcolor="#bbffbb" 
| 13
| December 11
| Burger King
| 115–104
| Cardona (32)
| Carey (14)
| Castro (10)
| Ynares Center
| 8–4
|- bgcolor="#edbebf" 
| 14
| December 16
| Alaska
| 119–113 (OT)
| Cardona (31)
| Carey (14)
| Castro (13)
| Araneta Coliseum
| 8–5
|- bgcolor="#bbffbb" 
| 15
| December 19
| Purefoods
| 101–98
| Alapag (17)
| Carey (10)
| Carey, Castro (4)
| Araneta Coliseum
| 9–5
|- bgcolor="#bbffbb" 
| 16
| December 23
| Sta. Lucia
| 117–112
| Cardona (34)
| Peek (12)
| Cardona, Castro (5)
| Cuneta Astrodome
| 10–5

|- bgcolor="#edbebf" 
| 17
| January 6
| Barangay Ginebra
| 82–105
| Alapag (17)
| Carey (9)
| Castro (6)
| Araneta Coliseum
| 10–6
|- bgcolor="#edbebf" 
| 18
| January 10
| Barako Bull
| 97–99
| Alapag (21)
| R. de Ocampo, Carey (12)
| Cardona (4)
| Araneta Coliseum
| 10–7
|- bgcolor="#bbffbb" 
| 19
| January 16
| San Miguel
| 93–91
| Cardona (26)
| Carey (10)
| Alapag (4)
| Zamboanga City
| 11–7

Playoffs

|-  bgcolor="#bbffbb" 
| 1
| January 29
| Barangay Ginebra
| 107–92
|  Castro (20)
|  Carey (13)
|  Cardona (7)
| Araneta Coliseum
| 1–0
|-  bgcolor="#bbffbb" 
| 2
| January 31
| Barangay Ginebra
| 106–105
|  Castro (19)
|  R. de Ocampo (13)
|  R. de Ocampo (3)
| Araneta Coliseum
| 2–0
|-  bgcolor="#edbebf" 
| 3
| February 3
| Barangay Ginebra
| 97–102
|  Cardona (18)
|  Peek, Carey (9)
|  Alapag (7)
| Araneta Coliseum
| 2–1
|-  bgcolor="#edbebf" 
| 4
| February 5
| Barangay Ginebra
| 20–27 (by forfeit)
| n/a
| n/a
| n/a
| Araneta Coliseum
| 2–2
|-  bgcolor="#edbebf" 
| 5
| February 7
| Barangay Ginebra
| 100–113
| 
| 
| 
| Araneta Coliseum
| 2–3

Fiesta Conference

Eliminations

Standings

Game log

Eliminations

Transactions

Pre-season

Philippine Cup

Trades

Subtractions

Mid-season break

Trades

Fiesta Conference

Trades

Imports recruited

References

TNT Tropang Giga seasons
Talk 'N Text